Näs or Nääs is a common placename in Sweden and in Finland, as it means isthmus. Places named Näs include:

 Näs bruk,
 Näs Castle,
 Nääs Castle and
 a hundred in Värmland